Daniel D. Corcoran (born September 13, 1957) is a Canadian professional stock car racing driver. He last competed part-time in the NASCAR Xfinity Series, driving the No. 74 Chevrolet Camaro for Mike Harmon Racing and in the NASCAR Gander Outdoors Truck Series, driving the No. 33 Chevrolet Silverado for Reaume Brothers Racing.

Motorsports career results

NASCAR
(key) (Bold – Pole position awarded by qualifying time. Italics – Pole position earned by points standings or practice time. * – Most laps led.)

Xfinity Series

Gander Outdoors Truck Series

 Season still in progress
 Ineligible for series points

References

External links
 

Living people
1957 births
NASCAR drivers